Luluc (Lou-Luke) are an Australian band, consisting of Zoë Randell and Steve Hassett, currently based in Brooklyn, New York. They have released four albums to widespread critical acclaim; 'Dear Hamlyn', 'Passerby', 'Sculptor' on Sub Pop records and Mistletone Records (for Aus/NZ) and 'Dreamboat' (Sun Chaser Records) in October 2020. The band is admired for their poetic writing, exquisite musicianship and understated yet compelling sound.

Albums

Dreamboat – 2020
Luluc released Dreamboat on October 23, 2020 to critical acclaim. Jay Ruttenberg in The New Yorker wrote "Throughout “Dreamboat,” Luluc's fourth album, Randell's singing is crystalline and unflappable, with a strange beauty that verges on creepy—it's the kind of voice that, on a movie soundtrack, portends unspeakable doom". Uncut Magazine wrote, "Randell's vocals, timeless and pure, carries something of a myth-making quality in its timbre" (Jan 2021).

NPR All Songs Considered featured Dreamboat upon release and Emerald City in Bob Boilen's Top 40 songs of 2020". Narc magazine reflected "perhaps the real triumph of Luluc's Dreamboat is the consistent lullaby/Karen Carpenter vocal delivery of Zoe Randell and her ability to find memorable, interesting, pop melodies within each of the different sonic textures. Shindig noted ""These are modern watercolors of ruminative elegance with an understated hypnotic flair".

Dreamboat was recorded partly in Berlin at PEOPLE festival and in Brooklyn, NY. Guest musicians include Aaron Dessner (The National), drummers JT Bates (Bon Iver), Jason Treuting (Sō Percussion), CJ Camerieri (yMusic) on trumpet; and saxophonist Stuart Bogie (Arcade Fire).

Sculptor – 2018
Released on 13 July 2018, Sculptor was produced by Steve Hassett and Zoe Randell in Ditmas Park, Brooklyn. It features guest appearances from J Mascis, Aaron Dessner and Jim White among others. In its first month of release, it won worldwide praise including Uncut Magazine's Album of the Month and 4 star and 8/10 reviews in The Guardian, Mojo, Line of Best Fit, Under the Radar and Q Magazine. Sculptor received BBC6 and BBC2 airplay, including on Iggy Pop's LA Confidential

Mojo observed that "Sculptor yields centre-stage to Randell's haiku-like celebrations of human spirit and suburban transcendence". Uncut declared "Sculptor is the strongest and most assured record of their career. The songs dig deep emotionally – but critically their aesthetics are well-balanced, the voice and instruments perfectly calibrated...Sculptor is wide open". Line of Best Fit concluded "Ultimately, the album repays careful and repeated attention, its varied qualities cohering effectively with a measured sense of control". Live reviews have also been full of praise "Randall's voice was warm and rich with each lyric that fell on the audience...Their overall sound was marked by a timelessness that also felt avant-garde in its minimalism".

Passerby – 2014
Passerby has received wide critical acclaim and was listed as the #1 album of 2014 by NPR Music's Bob Boilen and Stephen Thompson. Released on 15 July 2014, the album was co-produced by Aaron Dessner of The National, and recorded at his studio in Brooklyn. Sub Pop co-founder Jonathan Poneman, met and signed the band within 48 hours of hearing the master recordings. Poneman was sent the Passerby Masters by Peter Blackstock, co-founder of No Depression magazine.

The Wall Street Journal named "Passerby" as one of their best fifteen albums of 2014. Wilco named Passerby one of their "favourite recent releases" in 2015.

The album received 4 and 5 star reviews in Mojo, Bust, Allmusic and Lesinrocks amongst others. Passerby was No 1 added to CMJ radio in its week of release.  Dave Di Martino wrote in Rolling Stone USA that the record is a  "timeless, quietly special set" and that "Passerby is gorgeous and refined through and through".

Dear Hamlyn – 2008
Luluc released their debut album, Dear Hamlyn, in 2008; the songs were written following the death of Randell's father. Dear Hamlyn eventually gained a large group of influential admirers. Peter Blackstock co-founder of No Depression Magazine, wrote of the album, "The most beautiful album I've heard in ten years." In 2011 Nick Drake's producer, Joe Boyd, also taken by Dear Hamlyn, invited Luluc to feature in his Nick Drake tribute tour. They contributed the tracks "Things Behind the Sun" and "Fly" to the live tribute album, Way to Blue: The Songs of Nick Drake in 2013. Dear Hamlyn was reissued and given worldwide release on Sub Pop Records on March 8, 2019.

Collaborations
Zoe Randell is a co-writer on The National song "Pink Rabbits" from their 2013 album, Trouble Will Find Me.

Zoe & Steve sang backing vocals on the Leonard Cohen song “Listen to the Hummingbird” on Cohens final album, Thanks for the Dance.

Luluc were invited by Nick Drake's manager/producer, Joe Boyd, to cover Drake's songs as part of the Way to Blue: The Songs of Nick Drake tour and live album. Luluc's version of "Things Behind the Sun" was chosen as a lead single.

Zoe Randell sang harmonies on J Mascis (Dinosaur Jr.) song "I Went Dust" from Elastic Days.

Steve sang backing vocals on The National song "Lean" which was recorded for The Hunger Games: Catching Fire – Original Motion Picture Soundtrack.

Luluc covered the Townes Van Zandt song "None But the Rain", for the More Townes from the Great Unknown compilation.

Luluc covered The Flatlanders' song "Keeper of the Mountain", for the Italian magazine OndaRock'''s Outlaw Country compilation.

Luluc covered 1934 standard "Blue Moon", for RISING Festival's lunar-themed Singles Club series.

Luluc performed the Doug Sahm song "Sunday Sunny Mill Valley Groove Day" at the 2015 Doug Sahm Tribute concert in Austin, Texas.

Luluc collaborated with Xylouris White (Jim White (drummer) of Dirty Three, and Cretan Lute Master Giorgos Xylouris) on a cover of The Grateful Dead's "Til the Morning Comes" for the tribute album Day of the Dead. The project was curated by Aaron Dessner and Bryce Dessner of The National, with proceeds benefitting the Red Hot Organization.

Steve Hassett and Zoe Randell sing backing vocals on Big Red Machine; the collaborative project between Justin Vernon and Aaron Dessner.

Touring
Luluc have toured North America, EU, Aus/NZ on release of Dear Hamlyn, Passerby and Sculptor. They have toured with The National, J Mascis, Dinosaur Jr., Father John Misty, Fleet Foxes, Jose Gonzalez and Lucinda Williams among others.

Luluc have performed at numerous festivals around the world including; All Tomorrow's Parties (Curated by The National), Golden Plains Festival, Wilco's Solid Sound Festival, the Newport Folk Festival, St Jerome's Laneway Festival, SXSW, the 2018 PEOPLE Festival at the Funkhaus in Berlin and more. Luluc have performed at major venues worldwide including the Lincoln Center for the Performing Arts as part of the 2016 American Songbook series,  The Sydney Opera House and the O2 Apollo Manchester.

Television appearances
Luluc recorded at NPR Music's 'Tiny Desk' in September 2014. Host Bob Boilen remarked "I've spent more time listening to Luluc's second album, Passerby, than any other album this year. It's a calming, seemingly effortless affair: a marriage of graceful singing and storytelling, with guitars and textures that help create an unforgettable aura".

Luluc performed numerous songs live for Other Voices in 2014, including Passerby where they were joined by Aaron Dessner and Little Suitcase (Zoe performing solo).

Luluc's songs "I Found You" (Season 6, episode 19) and "One Day Soon" (Season 6, episode 21)
were featured on ABC's Grey's Anatomy.

Luluc song "Kids" was featured on ABC TV Series 2 of Mystery Road directed by Warwick Thornton, Wayne Blair and Rachel Perkins.

Luluc's "Gold on the Leaves" was featured on Season 10, episode 4 of Criminal Minds.

Luluc's "Star" was featured on Season 6, episode 6 of Parenthood.

Discography
Albums

 Dear Hamlyn - 2008
 Passerby - 2014
 Sculptor - 2018
 Dreamboat'' - 2020

References

External links
 
 
 Luluc on Sub Pop Records

Australian musical duos
Sub Pop artists
Male–female musical duos
Australian indie folk groups